Raw Hero (stylized as RaW HERO) is a Japanese manga series written and illustrated by Akira Hiramoto. It was serialized in Kodansha's Evening from September 2018 to August 2020, with its chapters collected in six tankōbon volumes. In North America, the manga is licensed for English release by Yen Press.

Publication
Raw Hero is written and illustrated by Akira Hiramoto. It was serialized in Kodansha's Evening from September 25, 2018, to August 11, 2020. Kodansha collected its chapters in six tankōbon volumes, released from February 22, 2019, to September 23, 2020.

In North America, the series is licensed for English release by Yen Press.

Volume list

References

External links
 

Kodansha manga
Seinen manga
Yen Press titles